Hazer may refer to:

Who or which hazes (an old word for scaring, confusing, harassing), such as 
The bull dogger's partner in steer wrestling, a rodeo discipline
A senior who participates in hazing at the expense of a pledge, as in a fraternity
A haze machine for stage lighting
A proper noun, such as 
Among Khazars, as their ruler Hazer Tarkhan